WNPV (1440 AM) is a radio station owned by Four Rivers Community Broadcasting Corporation. and licensed to Lansdale, Pennsylvania, United States. It serves Montgomery, Bucks and Philadelphia Counties, broadcasting a talk radio format. Founded in 1960, WNPV featured a blend of nationally syndicated and local talk shows, plus Fox News Radio updates and local news throughout the day. WNPV also aired Philadelphia Phillies baseball games, NASCAR and IRL races, as well as Penn State Football games and local high school football contests.

Closure and Rebranding
In March 2020, general manager Phil Hunt announced that WNPV would cease broadcasting at the end of April. In a statement, he said, "In recent years, it has become increasingly difficult to compete for both audience and advertising dollars, and unfortunately it is no longer sustainable to continue to run the business in a way that delivers the service our community expects and deserves." The station sold off its studio and broadcast tower to a school district in July. Its license was donated to Four Rivers Community Broadcasting in October and the station resumed broadcasting on January 9, 2022 broadcasting an Oldies format.

Local personalities
Darryl Berger
Rich Gunning
Chuck Irwin
Jeff Nolan
Joe LeCompte

Nationally syndicated personalities
Jim Bohannon
Michael Garko, PhD
Clark Howard
Dave Ramsey

References

External links

Radio stations established in 1960
NPV